Sukhumi is the capital of Abkhazia. 

Sukhumi may also refer to:

 SS Sukhumi, a Murmansk Shipping Company steamship

See also
 
 Sukhumvit (disambiguation)